Philippa "Pippa" Marrack, FRS (born 28 June 1945) is an English immunologist and academic, based in the United States, best known for her research and discoveries pertaining to T cells. Marrack is the Ida and Cecil Green Professor and chair of the Department of Biomedical Research at National Jewish Health and a distinguished professor of immunology and microbiology at the University of Colorado Denver.

Biography
Marrack was born in Ewell, England on 28 June 1945. Born in England, she maintains her British and American citizenship currently. Marrack's father served in the Royal Navy, so her family moved frequently throughout her childhood. Marrack notes that the longest she lived in one place during her early years was in Cambridge where she began pursuing her undergraduate degree. After attending Cambridge University, Marrack moved to the United States to complete postdoctoral work and research. In the United States she met her lifelong partner and husband, John W. Kappler. They have completed much research and accomplished many advancements in the fields of immunology, biochemistry, and molecular biology. Marrack and Kappler have two children together. Outside of science, Philippa Marrack enjoys playing the piano, as well as running along the Platte River with her Labradors.

Education 
Marrack completed both undergraduate (1967) and Ph.D. (1970) at Cambridge University in New Hall, Cambridge. During her Ph.D., Marrack worked at the MRC Laboratory of Molecular Biology with Alan Munro, where she began to study the differences between T cells and B cells. Alan Munro became her thesis advisor; she became the graduate student that worked with him due to his interest in working with a relative of John Marrack. John Marrack was Philippa Marrack's grandfather's brother, and a very well-known immunologist in the 1930s. Marrack notes that he indirectly influenced her to pursue the study of immunology.

Marrack then moved to La Jolla, San Diego with her first husband and completed postdoctoral work with Richard Dutton at the University of California, San Diego. She credits Dutton as having a tremendous impact on her career during her fellowship, as he taught her how to write, lecture, and run a lab, as well as how to think critically.

Career 
Marrack met her lifelong partner and current husband, John W. Kappler, as a postdoctoral fellow at the University of California, San Diego. Her first faculty position was at the University of Rochester, where she taught an undergraduate immunology course. The pair launched a joint lab at the University of Rochester. At the same time, she received independent funding from the American Heart Association and American Cancer Society to study T cells. Marrack obtained an associate professorship at the University of Rochester, followed by faculty positions at the National Jewish Health, Denver, Colorado and the University of Colorado Denver. She was also a Howard Hughes Medical Institute investigator. Throughout her career, Marrack has published over 300 peer-reviewed journal articles. Her numerous citations and journal articles places her as the third most influential researcher in the nation and distinguishes her as top female researcher.

Research interests 
In 1983 while working in the labs at the National Jewish Health in Denver, Colorado, Philippa Marrack and her husband and research partner, John Kappler, discovered and isolated the T cell receptor, together with Ellis Reinherz and James Allison. Resulting from this research, in 1987 Marrack discovered how the immune system is capable of molecular discrimination, as the human body can get rid of T cells that target the body's own tissues, destroying them in the thymus before they have a chance to cause problems, yet the body retains the cells that combat invaders. She learned that destructive cells that fail to be destroyed can cause autoimmune diseases like AIDS, diabetes, Multiple sclerosis, and lupus. This foundational work on immunological tolerance by Marrack and Kappler led to their later discovery in 1990 of superantigens: powerful toxins that stimulate a large amounts of T-cell proliferation and can cause devastating immune response and violent symptoms such as those seen in toxic shock syndrome or food poisoning. Marrack's current research projects focus on why certain autoimmune diseases, like lupus or Multiple sclerosis, are more prevalent in women than in men. Marrack and Kappler have recently discovered a population of B cells that may account for some of this observation. Her pioneering and revolutionary work isolating the T-cell receptor and describing how T cells protect against infection, drive autoimmune and allergic diseases, and play a possible role in rejection of cancers, has contributed greatly to the current understanding of vaccines, HIV, and immune disorders in the medical field.

Professional activities 
Marrack has served on editorial boards and many scientific journals including Cell, Science, and the Journal of Immunology. She has also served on various boards and panels for the American Cancer Society, the National Institutes of Health, and the Burroughs Welcome Fund. From 1986 to 2017, Marrack was a Howard Hughes Medical Institute investigator. From 1995 to 2002, Marrack served on the American Association of Immunologists Council and served as president of the American Association of Immunologists (AAI) from 2000 to 2001. She has been a member of the National Academy of Sciences in the United States since 1989 and a Fellow of the Royal Society in Great Britain since 1997. She is also the current Ida and Cecil Green professor and chair of the Department of Biomedical Research at National Jewish Health and a distinguished professor at the University of Colorado Denver. She joined the faculties of National Jewish Health and the University of Colorado Health Sciences Center in 1979.

Honors and awards
 1990 – Feodor Lynen Medal for Special Achievement and Distinguished Service
 1990 – Royal Society Wellcome Foundation Prize
 1991 – Elected to the American Academy of Arts and Sciences
1991 – William B. Coley Award
 1992 – The Ernst W. Bertner Memorial Award (MD Anderson Cancer Center)
 1993 – Cancer Research Institute William B. Coley Award
 1993 – Paul Ehrlich and Ludwig Darmstaedter Prize
 1994 – Louisa Gross Horwitz Prize (Columbia University)
1995 – Behring-Heidelberger Lecture Award
1995 – FASEB Excellence in Science Award
1995 – The Louisa Gross Horwitz Prize (Columbia University)
1996 – Dickson Prize in Medicine (University of Pittsburgh)
1996 – Honorary Doctorate of Sciences, Macalester College
1998 – The Rabbi Shai Shacknai Memorial Prize
1999 – Interscience Conference on Antimicrobial Agents and Chemotherapy Award
1999 – Howard Taylor Ricketts Prize (University of Chicago)
2000 – Lifetime Achievement Award, American Association of Immunologists
2001 – Irvington Institute Scientific Leadership Award in Immunology
2002 – Member, The Academy of Medical Sciences
 2003 – American Association of Immunologists Lifetime Achievement Award
2003 – Faculty Ambassador Award, National Jewish Health
2004 – Bonfils Stanton Award for Science
 2004 – L'Oreal UNESCO Women in Science Award
2004 – National Jewish Health Abraham J. Kauvar Presidential Award
2004 – University of Colorado Health Sciences Center, School of Medicine, Mentoring Award
2005 – Pearl Meister Greengard Prize
2006 – 
2008 – Elected member, National Academy of Medicine
 2010 – Inducted into the Colorado Women's Hall of Fame
 2015 – Wolf Prize in Medicine
 2015 – Inducted into the National Women's Hall of Fame
2016 – Novartis Prize for Basic Immunology
2019 – Clarivate Citation Laureate

References

Further reading

 HHMI Profile of work
 "Becoming a Scientist", Philippa Marrack, HHMI
 Christine Bahls, "Philippa Marrack", 'The Scientist' v.18, n.6, p. 13 (2004).
 "Profile: Philippa Marrack", Nature Medicine, v.10, n.12.
Oral History of Philippa Marrack, Ph.D. (AAI ‘74, president 2000–2001), https://vimeo.com/64907450

External links
 KM lab website

1945 births
L'Oréal-UNESCO Awards for Women in Science laureates
21st-century American women scientists
Members of the United States National Academy of Sciences
People from Ewell
Howard Hughes Medical Investigators
British immunologists
American immunologists
Women immunologists
British women biologists
Living people
Female Fellows of the Royal Society
English expatriates in the United States
Alumni of New Hall, Cambridge
University of San Diego alumni
University of Rochester faculty
University of Colorado Denver faculty
University of Denver faculty
Fellows of the Royal Society
American women academics
Members of the National Academy of Medicine